Peter Karmis (born 10 June 1981) is a South African professional golfer. Since July 2018, he has played under the Greek flag.

Karmis played college golf at Purdue University.

Karmis plays on the Sunshine Tour where he has won five times. He won the Lombard Insurance Classic in 2007 and 2009, the Sun Sibaya Challenge in 2016 and the Investec Royal Swazi Open and Sun City Challenge in 2017.

Karmis played on the Asian Tour from 2010 to 2012, winning the Handa Singapore Classic in 2010.

Professional wins (8)

Asian Tour wins (1)

Sunshine Tour wins (6)

Sunshine Tour playoff record (1–1)

Japan Challenge Tour wins (1)

Team appearances
Professional
World Cup (representing Greece): 2018

References

External links

South African male golfers
Greek male golfers
Purdue Boilermakers men's golf
Sunshine Tour golfers
Asian Tour golfers
People from Nama Khoi Local Municipality
White South African people
1981 births
Living people